The 3rd Society of Texas Film Critics Awards were given by the Society of Texas Film Critics (STFC) on December 19, 1996. The list of winners was announced by STFC president Joe Leydon. Founded in 1994, the Society of Texas Film Critics members included film critics working for print and broadcast outlets across the state of Texas.

Winners
 Best Film:
 Fargo
 Best Director:
 John Sayles – Lone Star
 Best Actor:
 Geoffrey Rush – Shine
 Best Actress:
 Frances McDormand – Fargo
 Best Supporting Actor:
 Edward Norton – The People vs. Larry Flynt and Primal Fear
 Best Supporting Actress:
 Miranda Richardson – The Evening Star and Kansas City
 Best Original Screenplay:
 John Sayles – Lone Star
 Best Adapted Screenplay:
 Anthony Minghella – The English Patient
 Best Foreign Language Film:
 Ridicule – France
 Best Documentary Film:
 Microcosmos

References

1996
1996 film awards